Sunnymeads railway station serves the once separate village of Sunnymeads in Berkshire, England, now subsumed by the neighbouring village of Wraysbury. It was built in 1927, and has been unmanned since 1969. Services to the station are operated by South Western Railway.

A Shere FASTticket machine can be found in front of the disused ticket office. Credit cards can be used to buy tickets. All-day travelcards are also available to buy, as well as tickets for use on underground services in and around the London area. Sunnymeads has one of the lowest passenger usages among stations in South East England with regular services.

It has one island platform which is reached by a pedestrian bridge. On the platform there are eight seats. There are no parking facilities or cycle facilities, as the station is at the end of a private road. Taxis can be arranged to pick up and drop off at this station, but there will be no taxis waiting. (The station can also be reached by a staircase from nearby Welley Road, which is a bus route.) There is a help-point for customer information, and visual displays show live train arrivals on the platform. This station is covered by CCTV which links to the South Western Railway security centre in Wimbledon.

Due to the short platform length, the ASDO beacon fitted to the South Western Railway fleet (with the exception of class 455) only releases the doors of the front 7 coaches.

Service

There is one train per hour in each direction on Sundays.

References

External links

Buildings and structures in the Royal Borough of Windsor and Maidenhead
Railway stations in Berkshire
Former Southern Railway (UK) stations
Railway stations in Great Britain opened in 1927
Railway stations served by South Western Railway